The 12th Canadian Comedy Awards, presented by the Canadian Comedy Foundation for Excellence (CCFE), honoured the best live, television, film, and Internet comedy of 2010.  The ceremony was hosted by Steve Patterson and held at the Isabel Bader Theatre in Toronto, Ontario, on 17 October 2011.

Canadian Comedy Awards, also known as Beavers, were awarded in 24 categories. Winners in 5 categories were chosen by the public through an online poll and others were chosen by members of industry organizations.  The awards ceremony was held during the five-day Canadian Comedy Awards Festival which ran from 13 to 17 October.

The film Peepers led with five nominations followed by the films Good Neighbours and Summerhood with four each.  The CBC show The Debaters, which moved from radio to television, was nominated twice for audio and twice for television.  Good Neighbours and Summerhood each won two Beavers, as did the TV series Less Than Kind, and Ron Pederson won twice for his improvisation work with National Theatre of the World.  Samantha Bee won the Beaver for Canadian Comedy Person of the Year.

Festival and ceremony

The Canadian Comedy Awards (CCA) was held in Toronto, Ontario, for a fifth non-consecutive year.  The awards ceremony was hosted by Steve Patterson and held on 17 October 2011 at the Isabel Bader Theatre, concluding the Canadian Comedy Awards Festival. The five-day festival, held from 13 to 17 October, featured live comedy performances by nominees at five Toronto venues including Yuk Yuk's, Second City, and Comedy Bar. Shaun Majumder hosted a showcase performance of the top stand-up acts at the Panasonic Theatre. The festival also included workshops by leading comedy professionals.

The CCA's parent organization, the Canadian Comedy Foundation for Excellence (CCFE), had partnered with Canada's Walk of Fame to produce an evening of Canadian comedy as part of the three-day Walk of Fame Festival.  Federal grant money went toward producing the event, which in turn had helped support and promote the CCA festival.

Winners and nominees
Nominees submitted to the Canadian Comedy Awards were considered by 170 jury members. The jury reduced the list of submissions to a top-five in each category which was announced on 9 June 2011 at Toronto's Second City theatre.  Online voting was held from 15 June to 5 July.  Six to seven thousand members of the public viewed brief performance clips on the website and voted for best TV show, best film, best web clip, best radio program or clip, and comedy person of the year. The other categories were voted on by industry members from the Alliance of Canadian Cinema, Television and Radio Artists (ACTRA), Canadian Actors' Equity Association, the Directors Guild of Canada, the Writers Guild of Canada, and the Comedy Association. The jury's choices counted for 30% of the total marks.

Gigcity noted that Edmonton was well-represented at this year's CCAs, with three nominations to locally-produced Caution: May Contain Nuts, two nominees each for best male improvisor and for best improv troupe, and a nominee for best radio show. This was credited to the city's strong improv scene.

Winners are listed first and highlighted in boldface:

Multimedia

Live

Television

Film

Internet

Special Awards

Multiple wins
The following people, shows, films, etc. received multiple awards

Multiple nominations
The following people, shows, films, etc. received multiple nominations

Footnotes

Notes

References

External links
Canadian Comedy Awards official website

Canadian Comedy Awards
Canadian Comedy Awards
Awards
Awards